Patrick Mainka (born 6 November 1994) is a German professional footballer who plays as a defender for 1. FC Heidenheim.

Career

Early career
Born in Gütersloh, Mainka played youth football for Victoria Clarholz and FSC Rheda before joining Arminia Bielefeld's academy in 2009. Mainka made his debut and only appearance for Arminia Bielefeld on 15 December 2013, coming on as a second half substitute for Marc Lorenz in a 4–1 victory at home to Greuther Fürth.

Werder Bremen II
Mainka left Arminia Bielefeld in the summer of 2014, joining Werder Bremen II for an undisclosed fee. On 1 August 2014, Mainka made his debut for Werder Bremen II in a 3–3 draw at Eintracht Braunschweig II, before scoring the first goal of his senior career in the following match at home to Schwarz-Weiß Rehden. He made 23 appearances in the league that season, scoring three, before scoring the winning goal in the second leg of the promotion playoff match Borussia Mönchengladbach II to promote Werder Bremen II to the 3. Liga. He made 9 appearances during the 2015–16 season for Werder Bremen II before leaving in January 2016.

Borussia Dortmund II
Mainka joined Borussia Dortmund II on a two-and-a-half-year contract in January 2016. He made his debut for the club on 6 February 2016 in a 1–1 draw at home to Viktoria Köln, going on to make 18 appearances during the 2015–16 season, scoring once. He remained a regular player over the next two seasons for Borussia Dortmund II, scoring 2 goals in 34 games across the 2016–17 season and 6 goals in 34 games during the 2017–18 season, and he was also captain of Borussia Dortmund II.

1. FC Heidenheim
In the summer of 2018, Mainka joined 1. FC Heidenheim on a two year contract, following the expiration of his contract at Borussia Dortmund. Mainka made his debut for Heidenheim in their second game of the season; a 1–1 draw away at Holstein Kiel. He scored his first goal for Heidenheim on 4 May 2019; a right footed shot in the 60th minute of a 3–2 defeat at home to SV Sandhausen. Across the 2018–19 season, he started 32 of Heidenheim's 34 games, scoring 2 goals. Having been a regular player for Heidenheim in early stages of the 2019–20 season, his contract was extended in November 2019 until the summer of 2024.

References

External links
 
 

1994 births
Living people
People from Gütersloh
Sportspeople from Detmold (region)
German footballers
Footballers from North Rhine-Westphalia
Association football defenders
Arminia Bielefeld players
SV Werder Bremen II players
Borussia Dortmund II players
1. FC Heidenheim players
2. Bundesliga players
3. Liga players
Regionalliga players